

References
Notes

References

Further reading
 
 

E